Lee Sung-hyun (이성현, born in 1972), also known as Mowg, is a bassist and composer of primarily film scores. Mowg has won multiple awards for his works in various films, such as I Saw the Devil (2010), Masquerade (2012), Hwayi: A Monster Boy (2013), Dongju: The Portrait of a Poet (2016),  The Age of Shadows (2016) and Burning (2018).

He was named Mowg because of his similar appearance to Mowgli in The Jungle Book.
 
In addition to his work in film, Mowg has produced albums by other artists, including the debut album by Korean pop star Jang Yoon-ju, Dream.

Discography 
The Witch: Part 2. The Other One (2022)
Anna (2022)
Confession (2022)
All of Us Are Dead (2022)
Dr. Brain (2021)
Another Record (2021)
The Man With High Hopes (2021)
Action Hero (2021)
Ground Zero (short film 2021)
Illusion: Between Reality and Fantasy (sound art 2021)
Night in Paradise (2021)
Dente por Dente (2020)
Untact (short film 2020)
Live Your Strength (short film 2020)
Deliver Us from Evil (2020)
Peninsula (2020)
Start-Up (2019)
Jesters: The Game Changers (2019)
EXIT (2019)
Homme Fatale (2019)
The Beast (2019)
Long Live the King (2019)
Persona (short film 2018)
Unstoppable (2018)
Intimate Strangers (2018)
My Dream Class (2018)
Miss Baek (2018)
Monstrum (2018)
Illang: The Wolf Brigade (2018)
The Witch: Part 1. The Subversion (2018)
Burning (2018)
Romans 8:37 (2017)
A Special Lady (2017)
The Outlaws (2017)
The Running Actress (2017)
V.I.P. (2017)
A Day (2017)
Warriors of the Dawn (2017)
The King (2017)
The Age of Shadows (2016)
A Bad Hair Day (2016)
Dongju: The Portrait of a Poet (2016)
Entourage (TV Series 2016)
Making Family (2016)
Like a French Film (2016)
Don't Forget Me (2016)
Dancing Cat (short film 2015)
The Best Director (short film 2015)
Informality (short film 2015)
Love Guide for Dumpees (2015)
The Advocate: A Missing Body (2015)
Memories of the Sword (2015)
Yellow (web drama 2015)
The Avian Kind (2015)
The Royal Tailor (2014)
Secret Door (TV Series 2014)
The Bicycle Thief (short film 2014)
Yeobaewoo (short film 2014)
Scarlet Innocence (2014)
The Fatal Encounter (2014)
Phantoms of the Archive (2014)
Three Charmed Lives (2014)
The Killer Behind, the Old Man (2014)
Miss Granny (2014)
The X (short film 2013)
Hwayi: A Monster Boy (2013)
One Perfect Day (short film 2013)
Behind the Camera (documentary 2013)
The Last Stand (2013)
How to Use Guys with Secret Tips (2013)
EDEN (2012)
A Company Man (2012)
Masquerade (2012)
Doomsday Book (2012)
Silenced (2011)
Bang! (short film 2010)
Super Otaku (short film 2010)
Vertical Limit (short film 2010)
Cross (short film 2010)
A Night on Earth (short film 2010)
Faces Places (short film 2010)
Camellia (2010)
The Influence (2010)
I Saw the Devil (2010)
The Present (short film 2009)
Planet B-Boy (documentary 2007)

Albums 
2019 Burning OST
2014 Dongju: The Portrait of a Poet OST
2013 The Last Stand OST
2013 Hwayi: A Monster Boy OST
2013 One Perfect Day OST
2012 Masquerade OST
2011 Silenced OST
2010 The Influence OST
2010 I Saw the Devil OST
2008 Nite's Secret 
2006 Journal
2005 Trio Romans (bass)
2004 Desire

Awards 
2019 Miami International Film Festival: Best Original Score (Burning)
2018 Buil Film Awards: Best Music (Burning)
2017 Asian Film Awards: Best Composer (The Age of Shadows)
2016 Korean Film Producers Association Awards: Best Music (The Age of Shadows)
2016 Korean Association of Film Critics Awards: Best Music (The Age of Shadows)
2016 Buil Film Awards: Best Music (Dongju: The Portrait of a Poet)
2014 Grand Bell Awards: Best Music (Miss Granny)
2013 Blue Dragon Film Awards: Best Music (Hwayi: A Monster Boy)
2012 Grand Bell Awards: Best Music (Masquerade)
2011 Blue Dragon Film Awards: Best Music (The Crucible)
2010 Blue Dragon Film Awards: Best Music (I Saw the Devil)
2005 Korean Music Awards: Best Performance of the Year (Desire)

References

External links 
 Mowg on Last.fm
 Mowg on onemusic.tv
 
 

Living people
1972 births
Music directors
South Korean film score composers